The Reducetarian Foundation  nonprofit organization that promotes a "reducetarian" diet, where participants reduce the amount of meat (as well as eggs and dairy) they consume in order to improve their health, protect the environment, and spare farmed animals from cruelty. Brian Kateman is the cofounder and president of the organization and one of the main proponents of the diet. He is skeptical of only using "all or nothing" messages like veganism and vegetarianism, believing that many people will be more excited about only partially reducing their animal product consumption.

References

Diets
Charities based in the United States
Semi-vegetarianism

External links 

 Official website